Springland, also known as the Dent House, is an historic house, located at 3550 Tilden Street, Northwest, Washington, D.C., in the Cleveland Park neighborhood.

History
The vernacular building was constructed in 1845, by United States Assistant Attorney General Henry Hatch Dent and his wife, Ann Maria Adlum Dent, daughter of John Adlum. 
There was an 1891 addition.
James Macbride Sterrett lived there, from 1891 to 1923.

Springland was added to the National Register of Historic Places, on August 9, 1990. 
Its 2009 property value is $2,768,220.

References

Houses on the National Register of Historic Places in Washington, D.C.
Houses completed in 1845
1845 establishments in Washington, D.C.